La buena vida may refer to:

La Buena Vida, an indie pop group from San Sebastián, Spain
La Buena Vida, a song by Camila Cabello, from her Tiny Desk Concert performance
The Good Life (2008 film), a 2008 Chilean drama film
The Good Life (1996 film), a 1996 Spanish comedy film